Mubarak Ismail Amber is an Emirati sprinter. He competed in the men's 4 × 400 metres relay at the 1984 Summer Olympics.

References

External links

Year of birth missing (living people)
Living people
Athletes (track and field) at the 1984 Summer Olympics
Emirati male sprinters
Olympic athletes of the United Arab Emirates
Place of birth missing (living people)